The Saint Francis Xavier Cathedral Parish, otherwise known as Kabankalan Cathedral, is the cathedral of the Roman Catholic Diocese of Kabankalan in the Philippines. It is located in the city proper of Kabankalan, Negros Occidental, in the Western Visayas region of the country.

History
 Christianization efforts in the island of Negros were started by the Augustinian Recollects during the Spanish colonial period. Kabankalan, then spelled as Cavancalan and Cabangcalan, was formerly a sitio of the neighboring municipality of Ilog. It is named after the bangkal tree. Kabankalan received its first parish priest in 1848. A chapel was built in 1905 by Fr. Tiburcio Fernandez. In March 1997, Kabankalan was separated formally from Ilog as an independent municipality through the Philippine Commission's Act 1612. The present church structure was built and inaugurated in December 1935 by Fr. Felipe Lerena. It was dedicated to Saint Francis Xavier, a 16th-century Jesuit priest. Among those who helped in building the church were Manuel Montinola, Engineer M. Sales, and the hacenderos of the province's sugar industry. The church of Kabankalan was elevated to the status of a cathedral when the diocese of Kabankalan was founded in 1987. The diocese administers the southern portion of Negros Occidental.

References

External links
 Facebook page 

Roman Catholic churches in Negros Occidental
Roman Catholic cathedrals in the Philippines
20th-century Roman Catholic church buildings in the Philippines